The Ed Block Courage Award is an annual award presented to a player from each team in the National Football League (NFL) who are voted for by their teammates as role models of inspiration, sportsmanship, and courage. Named in memory of Ed Block, a humanitarian and athletic trainer for the Baltimore Colts, the award is administered by the Ed Block Courage Award Foundation. Sponsorship proceeds promote the prevention of child abuse by raising awareness of the epidemic and assisting agencies who provide for the care and treatment of abused children.

Purpose and development
Ed Block was head athletic trainer for the Baltimore Colts from 1954 to 1977. He had earned a master's degree from the University of Missouri in 1937 and, following service as an army officer in World War II, a doctorate in rehabilitation and physical therapy from Columbia University. Block was also a physical therapist at a Baltimore, Maryland, hospital for disabled children. Following his retirement as Colts' trainer, local community leaders led by Baltimore businessman Sam Lamantia Jr. began an annual award in Block's honor in 1978, recognizing a Colts player for outstanding character. In 1984, the award was expanded when players on other NFL teams began to be similarly recognized. In 1986, the Ed Block Courage Award Foundation was incorporated as a charitable organization with Sam Lamantia Jr. as its CEO. The Ed Block Courage Award has since expanded to all 32 NFL teams.

The Baltimore-based foundation's twin objectives are to celebrate players of inspiration in the NFL and to raise public awareness and support prevention of child abuse. Radio public service announcements, along with televised programs, internet, and print media, are used by the foundation in furtherance of its mission.

Award selection and presentation
Every year, active players on each of the 32 teams in the National Football League vote for one member of their team who, in their eyes, "exemplify commitment to the principles of sportsmanship and courage". Those players selected are announced in late December.

Each March, the 32 selected players receive their Ed Block Courage Award at a banquet held in Baltimore. Past recipients include Robbie Gould, Joe Montana, Peyton Manning, and Dan Marino. The award trophy itself is a pewtered football helmet with the recipient's team logo and engraved with the player's name, team and year.

"Courage Houses" and other endeavors
The foundation has developed a national network of "Courage Houses" that help disadvantaged, neglected, and abused children. There are currently 27 Courage Houses across the country, each one tied to an NFL team. 

The foundation also sponsors the Baltimore Sports Media Hall of Fame Award and presents the Professional Football Athletic Training Staff of the Year Award. The Pro Football Weekly Assistant Coach of the Year Award is also presented at the annual Courage Awards Gala.

Winners

AFC East

AFC North

AFC South

AFC West

NFC East

NFC North

NFC South

NFC West

Athletic trainers 
Ed Block was the head athletic trainer for the Baltimore Colts for over 20 years.  In addition to honoring a player from each team, the award also honors the training staff for one NFL team as voted on by the Professional Football Athletic Trainers Society (PFATS).

References

External links
 

National Football League trophies and awards
Child abuse in the United States
Awards established in 1978
1978 establishments in the United States
Ed Block Courage Award recipients